Paraleptamphopidae is a family of amphipod crustaceans, containing three genera. Paraleptamphopus and Ringanui are both endemic to New Zealand, but Rudolphia lives in Chile.

References

Gammaridea
Crustacean families